

Plants

Cycadophytes

Cycadophyte research
Hopkins and Johnson briefly report the first occurrence of cycad leaves from the Eocene Okanagan Highlands Klondike Mountain Formation which will later be identified to the family Zamiaceae.

Angiosperms

Fungi

newly named

Arthropoda

Insects

Plesiosaurs

Newly Named Plesiosaurs

Archosauromorphs

Pterosaurs

Newly Named Pterosaurs

Non-avian dinosauromorphs
 Paleontologist Karen Chin received a coprolite that was excavated during 1995 from strata dating back to the Maastrichtian in Saskatchewan, Canada. The specimen was about 17 inches (44 cm) long and contained fragments of bone. Due to its size, contents and age, the coprolite was believed to have been the remains of Tyrannosaurus rex feces. This discovery was announced in a 1998 paper published in the journal Nature.
 A Saharan expedition under the leadership of Paul Sereno yielded fruit when a team member stumbled on the bones and skull of Nigersaurus taqueti. During this and a subsequent 1999 expedition about 80% of the animal's skeleton were discovered. Later in the year of the second expedition, a formal description of the animal was published.
 French paleontologist Philippe Taquet reported the finding of fossilized theropod embryos preserved in Portuguese dinosaur eggs. These eggs were from the Jurassic period dating to about 140 million years ago, nearly twice as old as any previously recovered dinosaur embryos, which had only been known from about 70 million years ago in Late Cretaceous strata.
 Psittacosaurus gastroliths documented.
 Panoplosaurus gastroliths documented.

Newly named non-avian dinosauromorphs
Data courtesy of George Olshevsky's dinosaur genera list.

Birds

Newly named birds

Synapsids

Eutherians

Humans
 Genetecist Michael Hammer reported findings that demonstrate that after the initial "out of Africa" radiation of modern humans at about 100,000 years ago, some humans eventually returned to Africa between 50,000 and 10,000 years ago.

Exopaleontology
Richard B. Hoover of NASA's Marshall Space Flight Center photographs what he believes to be microfossils in the martian Murchison meteorite.

References

 Carpenter, K. (1997) Ankylosaurs. In J.O. farlow and M.K. Brett-Surman (eds.), The complete dinosaur, pp. 307–316. Bloomington Indiana University Press.
 Xu, X. (1997) A new psittacosaur (Psittacosaurus mazongshanensis sp. nov.) from Mazongshan area, Gansu province, China. In. Z.-M. Dong (ed.), Sino-Japanese Silk Road Dinosaur Expedition, pp. 48–67. Institute of Paleontology and Paleoanthropology Academia Sinica. Beijing: China Ocean Press.
 Sanders F, Manley K, Carpenter K. Gastroliths from the Lower Cretaceous sauropod Cedarosaurus weiskopfae. In: Tanke D.H, Carpenter K, editors. Mesozoic vertebrate life: new research inspired by the paleontology of Philip J. Currie. Indiana University Press; Bloomington, IN: 2001. pp. 166–180.

 
1990s in paleontology
Paleontology